Qalandarabad-e Bala (also Romanized as Qalandarābād-e Bālā; also known as Qalandarābād) is a village in Soltanali Rural District, in the Central District of Gonbad-e Qabus County, Golestan Province, Iran. At the 2006 census, its population was 992, in 197 families.

References 

Populated places in Gonbad-e Kavus County